Qarmaq (plural: "qarmat") is an Inuktitut term for a type of inter-seasonal, single-room family dwelling used by Inuit.  To the Central Inuit of Northern Canada, it refers to a hybrid of a tent and igloo, or tent and sod house. Depending on the season, the lower portion was constructed of snow blocks or stone, while the upper portion used skins or canvas. To the Kalaallit of Greenland, qarmaq refers to the dwelling's wall. Qarmaq were built in the transitional seasons of fall and spring with a circular wall of stone, sod, or blocks of snow, a framework usually made from animal bones, which were covered with a skin.

History
Qarmaqs were used by the Inuit up to the 1950s. They were used as early as the Thule people, predominantly during the cold season. In winter, they also lived in igloo, especially while traveling, but when possible, the qarmaq was the preference.

Architecture
Finding the appropriate site for the qarmaq  included understanding the geological layout of an area in relationship to elements of weather.  Its construction involved men, women and children.
Snow qarmaq
Men collected and pieced together boulders and framework. Lacking timber, the framework was usually made of bone, preferably whale bone. Women and children gathered tundra moss for crevices, and prepared skins for roofing and siding. After winter snow arrived, the men used long knives to cut up blocks of snow, placing them in an outwardly direction for further protection. When the outer casing was attacked by the weather or gnawed on by wolves or foxes, women patched it up again and again, often with numb fingers in the freezing cold and biting wind.

Sod qarmaq
Summer tents, which were easy to transport, gave way to the sod qarmaq in fall.

Interior
Inside, qarmaqs offered warmth only by the flame of the qulliq. The sleeping area was slightly elevated and used caribou skin for padding.

References

House types
Inuit culture
 
 
 
Portable buildings and shelters
Buildings and structures made of snow or ice
Sod houses
Traditional Native American dwellings